Frodingham is a historic hamlet and now a suburb of Scunthorpe in the borough of North Lincolnshire, in Lincolnshire, England. The village lay directly to the south of the modern day Scunthorpe town centre, the name Frodingham is now often used to refer to the area directly to the north of the town centre.

Frodingham parish originally included the townships of Frodingham, Scunthorpe, Brumby, Crosby (part) and Gunness (part). The townships became civil parishes in 1866. In 1894 Brumby & Frodingham Urban District Council (UDC) was formed, separate from neighbouring Scunthorpe UDC. Brumby & Frodingham UDC was amalgamated with Scunthorpe in 1919.

St Lawrence's church was the centre of the original hamlet of Frodingham. Frodingham township and civil parish, sandwiched between Scunthorpe to the north and Brumby to the south, was 5 miles long and 1/4 mile wide. It ran from the Trent in the west, across the Lincoln Cliff, through the hamlet itself and across to Bottesford Beck in the east. It was here in the east end of the township that large deposits of ironstone began to be exploited in the mid 19th century: the Frodingham, North Lincolnshire and Redbourn Hill ironworks were established, and workers' cottages were built either side of Rowland Road, in an area then known as New Frodingham.

In modern times, the name Frodingham is now used to refer to the area around Frodingham Road in Crosby, and online maps reflect this usage.

The Trent, Ancholme and Grimsby Railway ran through the township, and the railway station was next to the Frodingham ironworks. The first Frodingham railway station was opened in 1866; the second station was opened in 1886, and closed in 1926.

In 1912, the Frodingham Ironworks was taken over by the Appleby Ironworks to form the Appleby-Frodingham Steel Company.

The North Lincolnshire Museum is in the former village vicarage, built in 1874 on the site of Frodingham Hall.

Frodingham Grade I listed Anglican church is dedicated to St Lawrence. Originating from the 12th century, it was rebuilt in 1841 except for the Early English-style tower. In 1916 Cox recorded a Carolean altar table, dated 1635. It contains memorials to the Healy family who added several windows within the church.

The vicar of Frodingham from 1655 to 1660 was John Ryther (c1638-1681). At the Restoration he was deprived of his living here and moved to Brough and was deprived again in 1662. After setting up Kipping Chapel near Bradford and some time in prison, he moved to London and began one of the first missions amongst seamen at Wapping in 1669. Due to his emotional preaching style, he was often known as 'Crying Jeremy.'

In 1885 Kelly's Directory reported a large temperance hall, built in 1871, that also housed a library and newspaper reading room. Chief crops grown in the area were wheat, barley and potatoes.

See also
Brumby Hall

References

External links

Hamlets in Lincolnshire
Scunthorpe
Borough of North Lincolnshire